The Last Great Traffic Jam is a live album and DVD from the English rock band Traffic. The album was recorded on the 1994 reunion tour supporting Far from Home.

DVD track listing

 "Pearly Queen" (Steve Winwood, Jim Capaldi) – 5:35
 "Medicated Goo" (Winwood, Jimmy Miller) - 5:38
 "Mozambique" (Winwood, Capaldi) - 5:30
 "40,000 Headmen" (Winwood, Capaldi) - 5:14
 "Glad" (Winwood) - 6:55
 "Walking in the Wind" (Winwood, Capaldi) - 7:12
 "The Low Spark of High Heeled Boys" (Winwood, Capaldi) - 14:36
 "Light Up Or Leave Me Alone" (Capaldi) - 16:26
 "Dear Mr. Fantasy" (Winwood, Capaldi, Chris Wood) - 7:44
 "John Barleycorn (Must Die)" (Traditional) - 6:57
 "Gimme Some Lovin'" (Winwood, Mervyn "Muff" Winwood, Spencer Davis) - 7:25

Bonus disc
(audio only)

 "40,000 Headmen"
 "John Barleycorn (Must Die)"
 "Low Spark of High Heeled Boys"

Personnel 
Traffic
 Steve Winwood – keyboards, guitars, lead vocals (1, 2, 4-7, 9-11)
 Jim Capaldi – drums, percussion, backing vocals, lead vocals (8, 10)
With:
 Randall Bramblett – keyboards, flute, saxophones
 Michael J McEvoy – keyboards, guitars, harmonica, viola 
 Jerry Garcia – guitar on "Dear Mr. Fantasy"
 Rosko Gee – bass guitar
 Walfredo Reyes Jr. – percussion, drums

Notes

References

Traffic (band) albums
1994 live albums